Two ships of the Royal Navy have been named HMS Ethalion after Ethalion, a mythical Greek sailor transformed into a dolphin for attempting to abduct Dionysus, whilst another was planned:

  was a fifth-rate frigate launched in 1797 which served in the French Revolutionary Wars but was wrecked in 1799.
  was a fifth-rate frigate launched in 1802 which served in the Napoleonic Wars. She was used for harbour service from 1823, was lent to the Harwich Corporation as a breakwater in 1835 and was on navy lists until 1877.
She was renamed HMS Mars in 1942, but was then renamed HMS Pioneer before her launch in 1944.

Royal Navy ship names